Shire Endaselassie F.C. (Amharic: ሽረ እንዳሥላሴ, Tigrinya: ጋንታ ስሑል ሽረ, also known as Sihul Shire FC) is an Ethiopian football club based in Shire, Ethiopia. They are a member of the Ethiopian Football Federation and play in the Ethiopian Premier League, the first division of football in Ethiopia.

History 
Shire Endaselassie was established in 2012 (2005 EC) in the city of Shire. 

The club joined the National League system in 2013–14(2006 EC) season and was later promoted to the 2016–17 (2009 EC) Ethiopian Higher League season.

The club was promoted to the 2018-19 Ethiopian Premier League after winning a playoff match against Jimma Aba Buna held in Hawassa Ethiopia. This was the club's first promotion the top tier of Ethiopian football.

Finances 
The club is run and funded by the Shire Inda Selassie municipality. Due to this the club has restricted financial resources and inadequate training facilities.

Players

First-team squad
As of 12 January 2020

Club Officials

Coaching Staff 

 Manager:  Daniel Tsehaye
 First Assistant Coach: Bereket Gebremedhin

References 

2012 establishments in Ethiopia
Football clubs in Ethiopia
Sport in Tigray Region
Association football clubs established in 2012